WNZK (680 kHz and 690 kHz) is a commercial AM radio station licensed to Dearborn Heights, Michigan, and serving the Detroit metropolitan area. It is owned by the Birach Broadcasting Corporation and airs an ethnic radio format. The programming is brokered, where hosts pay for their time and may advertise their clients' goods and services during their shows. It broadcasts in a variety of languages, including Arabic and several from Eastern Europe. WNZK identifies itself as "Station of the Nations."

WNZK is unusual in that it broadcasts on two different frequencies. During the daytime, it is heard on 690 kHz. But because that is a Canadian and Mexican clear channel frequency, WNZK must switch to 680 kHz at sunset.  Although 680 AM is also a clear channel frequency, the Class A stations that operate on it are in San Francisco and Alaska. Therefore, WNZK can operate on this frequency at night with its regular power of 2,500 watts, without interfering with those stations. It uses a directional antenna with a six-tower array off Will Carlton Road in Huron Charter Township, Michigan.

History
The western Detroit suburb of Westland was its original city of license. It switched to Dearborn Heights by 1990. The station was always owned by Birach Broadcasting. The original studios were at 21700 Northwestern Highway in Southfield, Michigan.

According to the FCC online database, WNZK is the only AM radio station in North America using two frequencies, one by day, one at night.

At one time, several radio stations in Detroit were multi-lingual. 97.9 FM aired a similar ethnic format for many years with a similar call sign, WMZK. It used the same "Station of the Nations" slogan until 1980. That station is now Urban Contemporary WJLB. Several Detroit-area AM stations were also aimed at different ethnic groups. But they have also changed to more mainstream formats.

See also
Media in Detroit

References

External links

Arab-American culture in Michigan
NZK
Radio stations established in 1985
Birach Broadcasting Corporation stations
1985 establishments in Michigan